Johans Oja (18 March 1904 – 25 May 1942) was a Latvian sprinter. He competed in the men's 100 metres and 200 metres events at the 1924 Summer Olympics. A police officer in Riga, he was executed by the Soviet Union in 1942.

References

External links
 

1904 births
1942 deaths
Latvian male sprinters
Athletes (track and field) at the 1924 Summer Olympics
Olympic athletes of Latvia
Latvian police officers
Latvian people of Estonian descent
Latvian people executed by the Soviet Union